LA-26 is a constituency of Azad Kashmir Legislative Assembly which is currently represented by the Syed Ifthikhar Gillani of Pakistan Muslim League (N). It covers the area of Muzaffarabad city in Muzaffarabad District of Azad Kashmir, Pakistan.

Election 2016

elections were held in this constituency on 21 July 2016.

Muzaffarabad District
Azad Kashmir Legislative Assembly constituencies